Budd Lake is a lake in Clearwater County, Minnesota, in the United States.

According to Warren Upham, Budd Lake was named "after an Ohio family name".

See also
List of lakes in Minnesota

References

Lakes of Minnesota
Lakes of Clearwater County, Minnesota